State Route 646 (SR 646) is a  state highway in Harrison and Jefferson Counties in eastern Ohio. The route runs from US 250 in Stock Township, northwest of Cadiz, to SR 43 in Island Creek Township, just outside Wintersville.

Route description
The intersection is on the shoreline of Tappan Lake. The state route heads northeast towards Scio through a valley formed by a small creek. Once it reaches Scio, the route makes numerous turns, has a grade crossing with an Ohio Central Railroad and the Conotton Creek Trail, and shares a brief concurrency with SR 151. Upon exiting the village, SR 646 travels in a more easterly direction. The route heads through the hills of Appalachia passing through the villages of New Rumley, the birthplace of General George Armstrong Custer, and Germano. East of Germano, the road intersects County Road 51 (formerly a grade-separated interchange) and an Ohi-Rail Corporation rail line.

At the Harrison–Jefferson County line, the route intersects County Road 39 in the community of Annapolis. SR 646 continues east through forest areas intersecting SR 152.

History
The first segment of SR 646 designated as a state highway was in 1937 on the route connecting Scio with its present eastern terminus at SR 43 near Wintersville. At its inception as a state route, most of the road was gravel-paved, though a short segment near Scio was asphalt-paved and another segment near the eastern terminus was dirt. More segments were paved until the 1960s when the road was fully paved.

The US 250-Scio segment was added to the state system in 1947. Since then, no major changes have occurred to the routing.

Major intersections

References

646
Transportation in Harrison County, Ohio
Transportation in Jefferson County, Ohio